KHHK, also known as "HOT 99.7", is a Rhythmic Contemporary Hit Radio station licensed to Yakima, Washington. The Stephens Media Group-owned station broadcast at 99.7 MHz on the FM dial with an ERP of 4.1 kW.

On May 26, 2010, it was rumored KHHK's parent company New Northwest Broadcasters's stations could possibly be sold in the near future. Principal of Revitalization Partners, Alan Davis says "The stations are on the air; it’s business as usual. I can only tell you there appears to be demand for the stations." In 2012, the stations were sold to James Ingstad of Fargo, North Dakota. In April 2018, it was in turn sold to Stephens Media Group.

Previous HD3 logo

References

External links

Rhythmic contemporary radio stations in the United States
Radio stations established in 1985
HHK
1985 establishments in Washington (state)